Markus Kaya (born 20 October 1979) is a German former professional footballer who played as a midfielder.

Career
Kaya made his debut on the professional league level in the Bundesliga for FC Schalke 04 on 29 May 1999 when he came on as a substitute for Jiří Němec in the 63rd minute in a game against TSV 1860 München.

In May 2008 he scored the ARD's Goal of the Month.

References

External links
 

1979 births
Living people
German footballers
Association football midfielders
Bundesliga players
2. Bundesliga players
FC Schalke 04 players
Rot-Weiss Essen players
Rot-Weiß Oberhausen players
FC Schalke 04 II players
SSVg Velbert players
Footballers from Berlin
VfB Hüls players
VfB Hüls managers
German football managers